inž. P. Beneš a inž. J. Mráz, továrna na letadla was a Czechoslovak aircraft manufacturer of the 1930s.

History
Beneš-Mráz was established at Choceň by Pavel Beneš and Jaroslav Mráz on 1 Apr 1935 and manufactured a series of light aircraft of their own design until the Nazi-German occupation. In 1939/40, the company was renamed Ing. J. Mráz, továrna na letadla - Ing. J. Mráz, Flugzeugfabrik. During the war, the factory was used to produce Fieseler Fi 156 "Storch"s and DFS Kranich training gliders for the German Luftwaffe. Following the war, the company was reconstituted as Ing. J. Mráz, továrna na letadla, národní správa.

Aircraft

See also
 Aero Vodochody
 Avia
 Let Kunovice
 Letov Kbely
 Zlin Aircraft

References

Notes

Bibliography

 Gunston, Bill. World Encyclopedia of Aircraft Manufacturers. Naval Institute press. Annapolis. 
 Taylor, Michael J.H. Jane's Encyclopedia of Aviation. Studio Editions. London. 1989. 
 Vos, Ruud. Luchtvaart 2010. Uitgeverij de Alk bv. Alkmaar. The Netherlands. 2009.

External links

 Czech Aircraft used by the Germans – German Aviation 1919 - 1945
 Civil Aircraft Register - Czechoslavakia – Golden Years of Aviation
 Inž. P. Beneš a inž. J. Mráz, továrna na letadla Choceň – Vrtulníky v Česku

Defunct aircraft manufacturers of the Czech Republic and Czechoslovakia